Massanet may refer to: 

 Damián Massanet, Spanish Franciscan priest 
 Guerau de Massanet, Catalan nobleman and poet
 Maria Baldó i Massanet (1884-1964), Spanish teacher, feminist, folklorist, and liberal politician

See also
 Massenet